Hovanec is a surname. Notable people with the surname include:

Helene Hovanec, American puzzle designer
Robert Hovanec (born 1993), American sprinter